Haliplectidae is a family of nematodes belonging to the order Araeolaimida.

Genera:
 Geohaliplectus Siddiqi, 2012
 Haliplectus Cobb, 1913
 Longitubopharynx Allgén, 1959
 Setoplectus Vitiello, 1971

References

Nematodes